Robert Bayles (7 July 1892 – 16 May 1959) was an Australian cricketer. He played one first-class match for Tasmania in 1913/14.

See also
 List of Tasmanian representative cricketers

References

External links
 

1892 births
1959 deaths
Australian cricketers
Tasmania cricketers
Cricketers from Tasmania